Janavale is a census town in Guhagar taluka. It is about 2 km from Shringartali which is the capital of Guhagar. There are 3 primary schools in town.

References

Cities and towns in Ratnagiri district